Giuseppe Volpi (born 13 May 1908, date of death unknown) was an Italian sailor. He competed in the mixed 6 metres at the 1936 Summer Olympics.

References

External links
  

1908 births
Place of death missing
Date of death unknown
Olympic sailors of Italy
Sailors at the 1936 Summer Olympics – 6 Metre
Italian male sailors (sport)